FC Novosibirsk is a Russian association football club based in Novosibirsk, playing at the Spartak Stadium. The club was established by the initiative of the Government of Novosibirsk Oblast.

History
The club was founded in 2019 to replace FC Sibir Novosibirsk, after the club was relegated from the Russian National Football league to the third-tier Russian Professional Football League, at the end of 2018–19 season.

Stadium

Novosibirsk's home ground is now the 12,500-capacity Spartak Stadium in Novosibirsk. It is a multi-purpose stadium which currently used mostly for football matches. It is the most easterly venue to have hosted a match in UEFA club competition.

Current squad
As of 22 February 2023, according to the Second League website.

References

External links
Official website 

 
Football clubs in Russia
Association football clubs established in 2019
Sport in Novosibirsk
2019 establishments in Russia